Amit Hasan is a Bangladeshi film actor who was elected secretary general of the Bangladesh Film Actors' Association in 2015. In its review of 2011 cinema, The Daily Star included Amit Hasan among "Other stars that deserve mention". In January 2015 Hasan participated in a strike of Bangladeshi film artists against the screening of the Indian film Wanted in Bangladesh, calling for a boycott of Bangladeshi theatres showing the movie.

Career

He was debuted by movie Chetona, directed by Chhotku Ahmed, in 1990. During that time he was performing in the name of Saifur. He was named after Amit Hasan by acting in movie Aamor Shongi, directed by late Alamgir Kumkum. He became successful as a single hero by movie Jyoti, directed by Monwar Khokon. He was debuted as a villain in digital movie Bhalobashar Rong, directed by Shahin-Sumon. He acted in role of Tufan in the movie. He has played different characters in many cinemas with many actresses such as Shabnur and Popy. Alongside Amit has also worked with other actors as Riaz and Shakib Khan.

Filmography

References

External links

Living people
21st-century Bangladeshi male actors
Bangladeshi male film actors
Place of birth missing (living people)
Year of birth missing (living people)